On 12 September 2005, the Australian House of Representatives Standing Committee on Environment and Heritage tabled its report on the inquiry into Sustainable Cities. The tabling of the report concluded the committee's inquiry. It provided a tangible definition of the concept of sustainability that can serve as a pathway for Australian cities to be vibrant and productive urban regions that are environmentally responsible and socially inclusive at the same time.

Conclusions
The report states that in order for an Australian city to be considered sustainable, it must aim to:

 "Conserve bushland, significant heritage and urban green zones;
 "Ensure equitable access to and efficient use of energy, including renewable energy sources; 
 "Establish an integrated sustainable water and stormwater management system addressing capture, consumption, treatment and re-use opportunities; 
 "Manage and minimise domestic and industrial waste; 
 "Develop sustainable transport networks, nodal complementarity and logistics; 
 "Incorporate eco-efficiency principles into new buildings and housing; and 
 "Provide urban plans that accommodate lifestyle, employment and business opportunities."

A key recommendation within this report was that the Australian Government establish an independent Australian Sustainability Commission headed by a National Sustainability Commissioner. This was restated in 2007 when the Committee presented its report on the inquiry into a sustainability charter entitled Sustainability for survival: creating a climate for change. The report also recommended the creation of an Australian Sustainability Charter, which would set national targets across a number of areas, including water, transport, building design and planning.

References

External links
Full Report

Government of Australia
Sustainability in Australia